Varda Bar-Kar is a film director, writer, and producer based in Santa Monica, California. She is best known for her short film Window, her viral video What Kind of Planet Are We On?, her documentary Big Voice,  9-1-1 (TV series), and her documentary Fandango at the Wall .

Life and career
Varda was born in London, England to a South African mother and Romanian father. She holds a BA in theater arts from Cornell University and an MFA in film studies from the San Francisco Art Institute (SFAI). She worked as a script supervisor for directors Jim Jarmusch, Wayne Wang and Carroll Ballard.

In 2015, Varda's feature documentary, Big Voice, won Best Premiere Documentary at the Heartland Film Festival and the 2018 PBS SoCal broadcast of Big Voice won a Bronze Telly Award. She is a member of the DGA, Film Fatales and the Alliance of Women Directors.

Filmography

References

External links
 
 

Living people
American women film directors
American women film producers
American women screenwriters
Film directors from California
Cornell University alumni
Year of birth missing (living people)
21st-century American women